Gerhard Pohl (16 August 1937 – 30 May 2012) was a German politician and a member of the East German CDU. He served as Minister of Economics from April to August 1990, in the cabinet of Lothar de Maizière.

Career

Education
Pohl held a diplom in engineering economics from the Dresden University of Technology. He was a member of the East German People's Chamber from 1981 to 1990.

Death
Pohl died on 30 May 2012 after drowning near his home of East Germany.

References

1937 births
2012 deaths
People from Guben
People from the Province of Brandenburg
Christian Democratic Union (East Germany) politicians
Christian Democratic Union of Germany politicians
Government ministers of East Germany
Members of the 8th Volkskammer
Members of the 9th Volkskammer
Members of the 10th Volkskammer
Free German Trade Union Federation members
TU Dresden alumni
Deaths by drowning
Accidental deaths in Germany